The 1901 Washington football team was an American football team that represented the University of Washington during the 1901 college football season. In its first season under coach Jack Wright, the team compiled a 3–3 record and outscored its opponents by a combined total of 59 to 48. Dick Huntoon was the team captain.

Schedule

References

Washington
Washington Huskies football seasons
Washington football